Haava may refer to:

Geography
Ha‘ava, channel in Marquesas Islands, French Polynesia
Haava, Tartu County, village in Tartu Parish, Tartu County
Haava, Sõmerpalu Parish, village in Sõmerpalu Parish, Võru County
Haava, former name of Haava-Tsäpsi, village in Vastseliina Parish, Võru County

People
Anna Haava (1864–1957), Estonian poet
Henno Haava (born 1973), Estonian runner

Estonian-language surnames